John, Count Palatine of Gelnhausen (24 May 1698 in Gelnhausen – 10 February 1780 in Mannheim) was Count Palatine and Duke of Zweibrücken-Birkenfeld at Gelnhausen.

Life 
John was the younger son of the Duke and Count Palatine John Charles of Birkenfeld-Gelnhausen (1638-1704) from his second marriage with Esther Maria (1665-1725), a daughter of Baron George Frederick of Witzleben-Elgersburg.

He was a Feldzeugmeister in the army of the Electoral Palatinate and commander of all troops and knights of the Palatinate Order of St. Hubert.  John was also a governor of Palatine Duchy of Jülich and commander of the fortress of Jülich.  He mainly lived in Mannheim.  After the death of his brother Frederick Bernard in 1739, he succeeded as Count Palatine of Birkenfeld-Gelnhausen.

Marriage and issue 
Johann married in 1743 in Dhaun with Sophie Charlotte (1719-1770), a daughter of the Wild- and Rhinegrave Charles of Salm-Dhaun.  Sophie Charlotte was the granddaughter of two of Johann's first cousins, making the couple first cousins twice removed in descent from Christian I, Count Palatine of Birkenfeld-Bischweiler. They had the following children:
 Charles John Louis (1745-1789)
 Louise (1748-1829)
 married Count Henry XXX of Reuss-Gera (1727-1802)
 Johanna Sophie (1751-1752)
 William (1752-1837), Duke in Bavaria
 married in 1780 Countess Palatine Maria Anna of Zweibrücken-Birkenfeld (1753-1824)
 Friederike (1753-1753)
 Sophia (1757-1760)
 Christian (1760-1761)
 John (1766-1768)

Ancestors

References 
 Johann Samuel Ersch: Allgemeine Encyklopädie der Wissenschaften und Künste: in alphabetischer Folge, section 2: H–N, part 21: Johann (Infant von Castilien) - Johann-Boniten, p. 189
 Maximilian V. Sattler: Lehrbuch der bayerischen Geschichte, Lindauer, 1868, p. 412

Dukes of Germany
House of Wittelsbach
Counts Palatine of the Holy Roman Empire
1698 births
1780 deaths
People from Gelnhausen